Dr. Faramarz Tamanna (born in Herat, Afghanistan) is a university professor,writer, an Afghan politician and the chancellor of the University of Afghanistan in Kabul. He was Director General of the Center for Strategic Studies of the Ministry of Foreign Affairs (Afghanistan). He holds his PhD from Jawaharlal Nehru University (New Delhi, India) in International Studies.

Before Being Presidential candidate, Dr. Tamanna has previously worked as Director General of the Center for Strategic Studies of the Afghan Ministry of Foreign Affairs, and before that was the Deputy Spokesperson at this Ministry. He has held other positions in Afghan diplomatic missions including Economic Cooperation Organization (ECO) abroad. He, also, has taught in several universities.

Tamanna also registered as a candidate for the 2019 Afghan Presidential Elections. Tamanna was the youngest candidate and finished fifth in the elections. His campaign slogan was "Wisdom and Development". Tamanna has given a series of television interviews.

He is the author of five books (Afghanistan's Foreign Policy on Regional Cooperation, US Foreign Policy towards Afghanistan, Afghanistan's Peace and Security Dilemma, Political Development in Afghanistan, and Foreign Policy of Afghanistan: Dynamism, Scope and Actions) and tens of articles covering security and international relations.

Education
Faramarz took his PhD in international relations from Jawaharlal Nehru University, India in November 2014. He took his MA in International Relations from Shahid Beheshti University, Tehran.

Books
US Foreign Policy towards Afghanistan (2009), research institute of Strategic studies Publications, Tehran.
Afghanistan's Foreign Policy on Regional Cooperation (2014),Afghan Ministry of Foreign Affairs, Kabul. 
Afghanistan's Foreign Policy: Dynamism, Scope and Actions (2020), University of Afghanistan, Kabul.
Afghanistan's Peace and Security Dilemma (2021), University of Afghanistan, Kabul.
Political Development in Afghanistan (2021), University of Afghanistan, Kabul.

Articles
"Afghanistan's Foreign Policy Towards Second Circle: Islamic World", in Andisha Scientific Quarterly, Kabul: Summer 2016.
"Human security in Afghanistan", in Strategic Studies Quarterly, Kabul: Winter 2011.
"The conceptual change in Interactor concept in International Relations", in Homeira Moshirzadeh and Nabiollah Ebrahimi, Conceptual changes in International Relations, Tehran: center for strategic studies, 2012.
"The role of Afghanistan in Iran-Pakistan relations", in Tayebeh Vaezi, Iran- Pakistan strategic relations, Tehran: Center for Strategic Studies, 2012
A Review on "London International Conference 2010 on Afghanistan", a Column on website  "Farda News", 23/02/2010,
"GHZA Crises and the Future of UN Peacemaking Policy in International Relations", Ettela'at Newspaper, Jan 3–4, 2010.
"Reviewing of new events in Afghanistan and the future of negotiation between Afghan Government with Taliban", 2009.
"Assessment of Iranian political parties about Iran-America negotiation and the future of this issue", 2009.
"Assessment of Iranian political parties about Iranian nuclear program" 2009.
"Development of Inter-actor concept in international relations", Kabul, Peiman-e Melli daily, Sep 2008. (Also published in strategic study quarterly, research institute of Strategic studies Tehran, 2008.)
"Afghanistan's Security Threats and the Iranian Foreign Policy", Research Centre of the Iran Parliament, July 2008.
"Reviewing of effective factors in Indo-Iranian strategic relations", Research Centre of Iran Parliament, July 2008.
"The new Afghanistan and the Afghan-Iranian relations", Tehran: research institute of Strategic studies, 2008.
"The ECO Countries policy to fight against Global finance crises" (to be published)
"The 8 years of The USA and NATO presence in Afghanistan", Ettela'at Newspaper, Jan 3, 2008. 
"Unbalancing of security system in South Asia and terrorism growth in Afghanistan", 2008.
"Nature and the roots of terrorism's emerge", 2008. 
"Reviewing of Iranian foreign policy in Persian Gulf region and Egypt", 2008.  
"Critique and assessment of point of view of Iran and Russia about Gas OPEC initiative", 2008
"Security concept in Constructivism School," Strategic Research Quarterly, no 13–14,  Kabul: Ministry of foreign affairs,  2007.
"Regional" Peace Jirga" and confidence-building in Afghan- Pakistan relations", Tehran: E'temad daily, Aug 2007.
"Realism Theory in International Relations", Strategic Research Quarterly, Kabul: Ministry of foreign affairs, 2007. 
"United States' strategy in Afghanistan after sep. 11", Tehran: Ettelaa't daily, 2007 
"Cultural challenges and internalizing of human rights in Afghanistan". 2007.
"United States' foreign policy after the Cold War", 2007.
"Globalization and its effect on the theorizing of opposite theories in international relations", Kabul: Ministry of foreign affairs, 2006.
"From the carpet of "Knowledge" to the distinction of 'Livelihood'", Hari Quarterly Magazine, 2002.
Articles translated from English to Dari:
Theo Farrell, "Constructivist Security Studies: Portrait of a Research Program," in International Studies Association, Blackwell Publishing, UK, 2002, pp. 49–72.
David Held, "Violence, Law, and Justice in a Global Age," in Leonard, Mark, Re-Ordering the World, London: The Foreign policy Center, pp. 56–72.
Paul Wapner, "The Normative Promise of Nonstate Actors: A Theoretical Account of Global Civil society," in P. Wapner and L. Ruiz, eds., Principled World Politics, Lanham: Rowman and Littlefield, pp. 261–274.

Conferences and presentations
Speaker on international/Afghanistan related issues, at many international conferences in Nepal, India, China, Germany, United States of America, Turkey, Russia, Tajikistan, Belgium, etc. 
Leading speech on The New International System and its requirements for Afghanistan's Foreign Policy, Ministry of Foreign Affairs, Kabul, Afghanistan, Oct. 2010.  
Leading speech: Seminar on the 2008 Presidential Election of Afghanistan and The future of this country's role in international relations, Institute for the West study. Tehran, Iran, 2009.
Leading speech: The First scholarly Seminar on "Evaluation of the Principles of Foreign Policy of Afghanistan", Herat University, Afghanistan, Nov. 2008. 
Leading speech: seminar on NATO's role in security and stability of Afghanistan, Andishe-sazan-e Noor Research Institute, Tehran, Iran, 2008.
Scientific interview: "USA and NATO's Policy against Terrorism in Afghanistan", Fars News Agency, (also with Jawedan News Agency), 6 Nov 2008.
Leading speech: seminar on the USA strategy in Afghanistan, the research institute of Strategic studies 2007.
Speech: Conference on Reviewing the Security and Stability in Afghanistan, Tehran University, Iran, 2007.
Leading speech: Seminar on the Security issues in Afghanistan, Andishe-sazan-e Noor Research Institute, Tehran, Iran, 2007.
Speech: Conference on Comparison between Constitutions of Afghanistan and Iran, Rafsanjan University, Iran, 2005.
Participation: AL ALAM TV Live Program on Afghanistan First Presidential Election. {Mr. Hafiz Manssoor and Sattar Sirat (Two Antagonists) also participated from Kabul via video conference.} 2004.
Leading speech: Conference on Dialogue among Civilization, National University, Tehran, Iran, 2001.

References

1977 births
Afghan politicians
Living people
People from Herat
Government ministers of Afghanistan